The 1986 United States Senate election in California took place on November 4, 1986. Incumbent Democratic U.S. Senator Alan Cranston narrowly won re-election to a fourth and final term over Republican U.S. Congressman Ed Zschau.

Democratic primary

Candidates
 John Hancock Abbott, perennial candidate
 Robert John Banuelos, resident of Costa Mesa
 Alan Cranston, incumbent Senator
 Charles Greene
 Brian Lantz, candidate for Mayor of San Francisco in 1983

Results

Republican primary

Candidates
 William B. Allen, professor at Harvey Mudd College and member of the National Council on the Humanities
 Michael D. Antonovich, Los Angeles County Supervisor and former State Assemblyman
 Eldridge Cleaver, author and former Black Panther
 Edward M. Davis, State Senator and former chief of the Los Angeles Police Department
 Bobbi Fiedler, U.S. Representative from Encino
 Bruce Herschensohn, political commentator for KABC-TV in Los Angeles
 Joe Knowland, actor, publisher of The Oakland Tribune and son of former Senator William F. Knowland
 Art Laffer, economic advisor to President Ronald Reagan
 George Montgomery
 Robert W. Naylor, State Assemblyman from Menlo Park
 William H. Pemberton, candidate for Senate in 1982
 John W. Spring
 Ed Zschau, U.S. Representative from Los Altos

Results

Peace and Freedom primary

Candidates
 Lenni Brenner, Trotskyist anti-war activist and writer
 Paul Kangas, private investigator and perennial candidate

Results

General election

Results

See also
 1986 United States Senate elections

References

1986
California
1986 California elections